Mathias Ferdinand Kräutler (2 May 1895 – 8 September 1968) was an Austrian militant and officer, most recently a major general in World War II, who served in the Lapland War.

Biography 
Mathias Kräutler was born in Vienna in Austria-Hungary, in 1913/15 he studied at the Teresian Academy. On March 15, 1915, he joined the Austro-Hungarian army. Participant of the First World War. On February 24, 1919, he continued his service in the Austrian army. From March 2, 1937, he was the commander of the 1st battalion of the 12th infantry regiment. After the Anschluss on March 15, 1938, he automatically joined the Wehrmacht. From April 26, 1938, he was the 1st officer of the General Staff of the Commander of the 2nd Infantry. From May 20, 1938, he was the commander of the 3rd Battalion of the 12th Infantry Regiment (from August 1, 1938, he was the 135th Mountain Infantry Regiment of the 2nd Mountain infantry division). On December 5-17, he passed the General Staff officer's course. From January 27, 1942, he was the commander of the 139th Mountain Infantry Regiment of the 3rd Mountain Infantry Division. On March 1, 1944, he was sent to the reserve, he completed the courses of division commander and officer of tank forces. From August 10, 1944 - the commander of the "Kreutler" divisional group (from October 1 - the 140th division for special assignments, from May 5, 1945 - the 9th mountain-infantry division "Nord"). On May 8, 1945, he was captured by British troops. On January 15, 1947, he was dismissed. He died in Salzburg, Austria at 73 years old.

Ranks 

 Lieutenant (March 15, 1915)
 Oberleutnant (November 1, 1916)
 Hauptmann (July 8, 1921)
 Major (August 31, 1931)
 Oberstleutnant (June 1, 1939)
 Oberst (February 1, 1942)
 Major General (October 1, 1944)

Awards 

 Medal "For Military Merit" (Austria-Hungary)
 Cross "For Military Merit" (Austria-Hungary) 3rd class with military decoration and swords - awarded twice (1918).
 Medal "For Wounding" (Austria-Hungary) with one stripe - in June 1918 he was seriously injured by falling stones.
 Commemorative military medal (Austria) with swords
 Honorary Saber for excellent pistol shooting (1930)
 Gold Medal of Honor "For Services to the Republic of Austria"
 Military Merit Cross (Austria) 3rd class (November 6, 1937)
 Commemorative military medal (Hungary) with swords
 Cross of honor of a veteran of the war with swords
 Medal "For years of service in the Wehrmacht" 4th, 3rd, 2nd and 1st class (25 years)
 The "For Wounding" breastplate in black is a replacement for the Austro-Hungarian "For Wounding" medal.
 Assault infantry badge in silver (August 30, 1941)
 Order of the Cross of Freedom 2nd class with swords (Finland; June 30, 1942)
 Medal "For the winter campaign in the East 1941/42" (August 15, 1942)
 German Cross in Gold (January 25, 1945)

References 

1895 births
1968 deaths
Nazi Germany